Brook is a surname. Notable people with the surname include:

Abraham Brook (flourished 1789), English physicist and bookseller
Basil Brook (1576 – c. 1646), English ironmaster, see Basil Brooke (metallurgist)
Andrew Brook (born 1943), Canadian philosopher
Benjamin Brook (1776–1848), English nonconformist minister and religious historian
Charles Brook (philanthropist) (1814–1872), English philanthropist
Claudio Brook (1927–1995), Mexican actor
Clive Brook (1887–1974), English actor
David Brook (disambiguation)
Eric Brook (1907–1965), English footballer
Faith Brook (1922–2012), English actress
George Brook (cricketer) (1888–1966), English cricketer
, British zoologist
Gina Knee Brook (1898–1982), American painter 
Helen Brook (1907–1997), British family planning adviser 
Holly Brook (born 1986), American singer and songwriter
Jayne Brook (born 1962), American actress
Kelly Brook (born 1979), English model
Michael Brook (born 1951), Canadian guitarist, inventor, producer, and film music composer
Norman Brook, 1st Baron Normanbrook (1902–1967), British civil servant.
Peter Brook (1925–2022), English theatre and film director and innovator
Rhidian Brook (born 1964), British novelist, screenwriter and broadcaster
Richard Brook (chief executive), English executive
Timothy Brook (historian) (born 1951), Canadian historian
Tom Brook (born 1953), BBC World presenter
William Broke or Brook, English 16th-century college and university head
Yaron Brook (born 1961), Israeli-American entrepreneur and writer

See also
Brooks (surname)

English-language surnames